Albany is a village in Whiteside County, Illinois, United States. The population was 891 at the 2010 census, down from 895 in 2000.

History
Albany was laid out in 1837, and named after Albany, New York, the native home of a large share of the first settlers. A post office called Albany has been in operation since 1838.

Geography
Albany is located at  (41.788411, -90.219128).

Demographics

As of the census of 2000, there were 895 people, 349 households, and 262 families residing in the village. The racial makeup of the village was 98.66% White, 0.67% African American, 0.22% from other races, and 0.45% from two or more races. Hispanic or Latino of any race were 0.56% of the population.

There were 349 households, out of which 33.5% had children under the age of 18 living with them, 63.0% were married couples living together, 8.3% had a female householder with no husband present, and 24.9% were non-families. 21.8% of all households were made up of individuals, and 9.2% had someone living alone who was 65 years of age or older. The average household size was 2.56 and the average family size was 2.98.

In the village, the population was spread out, with 26.8% under the age of 18, 5.8% from 18 to 24, 28.3% from 25 to 44, 26.1% from 45 to 64, and 13.0% who were 65 years of age or older. The median age was 38 years. For every 100 females, there were 94.6 males. For every 100 females age 18 and over, there were 90.4 males.

The median income for a household in the village was $46,719, and the median income for a family was $51,333. Males had a median income of $40,521 versus $20,938 for females. The per capita income for the village was $18,780. About 3.7% of families and 5.3% of the population were below the poverty line, including 7.7% of those under age 18 and 0.9% of those age 65 or over.

Notable people
Nan Sheets, painter and museum director

References

Villages in Illinois
Villages in Whiteside County, Illinois
Illinois populated places on the Mississippi River
Populated places established in 1837
1837 establishments in Illinois